A fibre-optic gyroscope (FOG) senses changes in orientation using the Sagnac effect, thus performing the function of a mechanical gyroscope.

Operation
Two beams from a laser are injected into the same fibre but in opposite directions. Due to the Sagnac effect, the beam travelling against the rotation experiences a slightly shorter path delay than the other beam. The resulting differential phase shift is measured through interferometry, thus translating one component of the angular velocity into a shift of the interference pattern which is measured photometrically.

Beam splitting optics split light from a laser diode (or other laser light source) into two waves propagating in both clockwise and anticlockwise directions through a coil consisting of many turns of optical fibre. The strength of the Sagnac effect is dependent on the effective area of the closed optical path: this is not simply the geometric area of the loop but is also increased by the number of turns in the coil. The FOG was first proposed by Vali and Shorthill in 1976. Development of both the passive interferometer type of FOG, or IFOG, and a newer concept, the passive ring resonator FOG, or RFOG, is proceeding in many companies and establishments worldwide.

Advantages
A FOG provides extremely precise rotational rate information, in part because of its lack of cross-axis sensitivity to vibration, acceleration, and shock. Unlike the classic spinning-mass gyroscope or resonant/mechanical gyroscopes, the FOG has no moving parts and doesn't rely on inertial resistance to movement. Hence, the FOG is an excellent alternative to a mechanical gyroscope. Because of their intrinsic reliability and long lifetime, FOGs are used for high performance space applications  and military inertial navigation systems.

The FOG typically shows a higher resolution than a ring laser gyroscope.

FOGs are implemented in both open-loop and closed-loop configurations.

Disadvantages
Like all other gyroscope technologies and depending on detailed FOG design, FOGs may require initial calibration (determining which indication corresponds to zero angular velocity). 

Some FOG designs are somewhat sensitive to vibrations. However, when coupled with multiple-axis FOG and accelerometers and hybridized with Global Navigational Satellite System (GNSS) data, the impact is mitigated, making FOG systems suitable for high shock environments, including gun pointing systems for 105mm and 155mm howitzers.

See also
 Attitude and Heading Reference System
 Hemispherical resonator gyroscope
 Inertial measurement unit
 Inertial navigation
 Vibrating structure gyroscope
 Quantum gyroscope

References

Sources
 Anthony Lawrence, Modern Inertial Technology: Navigation, Guidance, and Control, Springer, Chapters 11 and 12 (pages 169–207), 1998. .
 
 R.P.G. Collinson, Introduction to Avionics Systems, 2003 Kluwer Academic Publishers, Boston. .
 José Miguel López-Higuer, Handbook of Fibre Optic Sensing Technology, 2000, John Wiley & Sons Ltd.
 Hervé Lefèvre, The Fiber-Optic Gyroscope, 1993, Artech House. .

Gyroscopes
Gyroscope